Love Is My Religion is Ziggy Marley's second solo album, the first being Dragonfly, after the 2000 end of Ziggy Marley & The Melody Makers. The album was released on July 2, 2006 by father Bob Marley's label Tuff Gong Worldwide, and carries on his reggae-style pop sound and lyrical themes established in Dragonfly. Love Is My Religion was named the 2007 Best Reggae album for the 49th Grammy awards held in Los Angeles in 2007.

Track listing
 "Into the Groove"
 "Love Is My Religion"
 "Make Some Music"
 "Friend"
 "Black Cat"
 "Beach in Hawaii"
 "A Lifetime"
 "Be Free"
 "Keep on Dreaming"
 "Still the Storm"
 "Love Is My Religion" (acoustic)
 "Be Free" (Dub)
 "Jammin'" (live) (UK bonus track)
 "Dragonfly" (live) (UK bonus track)
 "Look Who's Dancing" (live) (UK bonus track)

Personnel
Takeshi Akimoto – Guitar
Tommy Barbarella – Fender Rhodes
Ron Blake- Horn
Ken Chastain – Percussion
Luis Conte – Percussion
Joel Derouin – Violin
Paul Fakhourie – Bass
Aaron Fessel – Assistant Engineer
Lior Goldenberg – Assistant Engineer
Tracy Hazzard – Background Vocals
Ross Hogarth – Percussion, Producer, Engineer, Mixing
Suzie Katayama – Conductor, String Arrangements
Brian Malouf – Mixing
Stephen Marley – Guitar
Ziggy Marley – Organ, Bass, Guitar, Percussion, Piano, Keyboards, Producer, Liner Notes
Marc Moreau – Guitar, Engineer, Mixing
Gregory J. Morris – Assistant Engineer
Natasha Pierce – Background Vocals
Tim Pierce – Guitar
David Ralicke – Horn, Saxophone
Michele Richards – Violin
Jake Shimabukuro – Ukulele
Rudolph Stein – Cello
Tracy Wannomae – Flute, Horn
Dan Warner – Acoustic Guitar
Dave Way – Synthesizer, Mixing

Chart performance

Album

References

External links
Love Is My Religion at Marley's website
[ Love Is My Religion] at Allmusic

2006 albums
Ziggy Marley albums
Grammy Award for Best Reggae Album
Tuff Gong albums